Firm Roots is an album by saxophonist Clifford Jordan which was recorded in West Germany in 1975 and first released on the Danish SteepleChase label but also released in the US by Inner City.

Reception

In his review on AllMusic, Ron Wynn called the album "One of Jordan's best releases with The Magic Triangle ensemble."

Track listing 
 "Firm Roots" (Cedar Walton) – 8:43   
 "Angel in the Night" (Billy Higgins) – 8:56   
 "Scorpio" (Sam Jones) – 3:50   
 "Bear Cat" (Clifford Jordan) – 4:49 Bonus track on CD reissue   
 "Inga" (Higgins) – 7:57   
 "Voices Deep Within Me" (Walton) – 6:28   
 "One for Amos" (Jones) – 8:27

Personnel 
Clifford Jordan – tenor saxophone; flute on "Angel in the Night"
Cedar Walton – piano
Sam Jones – bass
Billy Higgins – drums

References 

Clifford Jordan albums
1975 albums
SteepleChase Records albums